Cape Verde competed at the 2019 African Games held from 19 to 31 August 2019 in Rabat, Morocco. In total, athletes representing the country won one bronze medal and the country finished last in the medal table, in 41st place, shared with Central African Republic.

Medal summary

Medal table 

|  style="text-align:left; width:78%; vertical-align:top;"|

|  style="text-align:left; width:22%; vertical-align:top;"|

Athletics 

Five athletes represented Cape Verde in athletics.

Eveline Sanches competed in both the women's 100 metres and the women's 200 metres events. In both events she did not advance to the semifinals.

Carla Mendes competed in the women's 800 metres event. She was also scheduled to compete in the women's 1500 metres event but she did not start.

Jordin Andrade competed in the men's 400 metres hurdles. He did not advance to compete in the final.

Samuel Freire competed in the men's 5000 metres event. He finished in 19th place. He also competed in the men's 10,000 metres. He did not finish in that event.

Ruben Sança competed in the men's half marathon and he finished in 16th place.

Beach volleyball 

Cape Verde was scheduled to compete in beach volleyball but did not compete.

Boxing 

Albertino Miguel Monteiro, Davilson Morais, Ivanusa Moreira, Sergio Antonio Rodrigues, Gelson Rodnex Semedo, Wilson Carlos Semedo and Carlos Antonio Silva were scheduled to compete in boxing.

Ivanusa Moreira won the bronze medal in the women's welterweight (69kg) event.

Chess 

Loedi Gomes, Luis Carlos Moniz, Honorina Morais and Joel David Pires competed in chess.

Luis Carlos Moniz and Joel David Pires both competed in the men's blitz individual and men's rapid individual events.

Loedi Gomes and Honorina Morais both competed in the women's blitz individual and women's rapid individual events.

All four competed in the mixed team event where they finished in last place.

Karate 

Danisia Emely Conceicao, Jose Mario Goncalves, Irlanda Lopes and Jelson Varela competed in karate.

Taekwondo 

Four athletes competed in Taekwondo.

Volleyball 

Cape Verde's national volleyball team qualified to compete at the 2019 African Games. They lost all five games in the men's tournament.

References 

Nations at the 2019 African Games
2019
African Games